Lee Hyeon-seong (born 20 May 1993) is a South Korean footballer who plays for Seoul E-Land.

Career
Lee Hyeon-seong joined Incheon United on 17 January 2017. He moved to Gyeongnam FC before the 2017 season starts.

References

External links 
 

1993 births
Living people
South Korean footballers
Association football midfielders
Association football forwards
Incheon United FC players
Gyeongnam FC players
Seoul E-Land FC players
K League 1 players
K League 2 players
Yong In University alumni
South Korea under-20 international footballers
South Korea under-23 international footballers